Nicolás Italo Lombardo, also known as Nicola Italo Lombardo (born March 13, 1903 in Buenos Aires) was an Argentine professional football player and coach. He also held Italian citizenship.

He played for three seasons (42 games, eight goals) in the Serie A for A.S. Roma.

External links

1903 births
Year of death missing
Argentine footballers
Argentine expatriate footballers
Serie A players
Serie B players
A.S. Roma players
Pisa S.C. players
Argentine football managers
Argentine people of Italian descent
Argentine emigrants to Italy
Expatriate football managers in Chile
Citizens of Italy through descent
Argentine expatriate sportspeople in Italy
Association football forwards
Footballers from Buenos Aires